The 1919 TCU Horned Frogs football team represented Texas Christian University (TCU) as a member of the Texas Intercollegiate Athletic Association (TIAA) during the 1919 college football season. Led by Ted D. Hackney in his first and only year as head coach, the Horned Frogs compiled an overall record of 1–7. The team's captain was Will Hill Acker, who played tackle.

Schedule

References

TCU
TCU Horned Frogs football seasons
TCU Horned Frogs football